Mats Knoester (born 19 November 1998) is a Dutch professional footballer who plays as a centre back for Hungarian club Ferencváros.

Club career
Knoester joined the Feyenoord youth academy and developed there for 14 years, before transferring to Heracles on 17 January 2019. Knoester made his professional debut with Heracles in a 1–0 Eredivisie win over AFC Ajax on 9 February 2019.

On 26 May 2022, Knoester signed with Ferencváros in Hungary.

References

External links
 
 OnsOranje U16 Profile
 OnsOranje U17 Profile
 Onsoranje U19 Profile
 Feyenoord Academy Profile

1998 births
Living people
Dutch footballers
Footballers from Alphen aan den Rijn
Association football central defenders
Netherlands youth international footballers
Eredivisie players
Nemzeti Bajnokság I players
Heracles Almelo players
Ferencvárosi TC footballers
Dutch expatriate footballers
Dutch expatriate sportspeople in Hungary
Expatriate footballers in Hungary